Nasrollah Pirnia, also known as Mirza Nasrollah Khan (17 October 1840 – 13 September 1907, titled Moshir al-Dowleh), was the first Iranian Prime Minister. He became Prime Minister of Iran following the introduction of the Persian Constitution of 1906, establishing Iran's first legitimate government approved by the Majlis on 7 October 1906. Before becoming Prime Minister, he had served as the Minister of Foreign Affairs. He died in circumstances said to be suspicious and was buried in Imamzadeh Saleh of Tajrish.

Moshir ad-Dowleh Mansion belonged to him and his children.

Early life
Born in 1840 to a family of religious leaders, he grew up in Nain before later travelling to Tehran. In 1862 he married Hosnieh,  daughter of a wealthy merchant named Mirza Taghi Ajudan. Two of their children, Hassan and Hossein, would later draft the Persian Constitution of 1906 and play key roles in Iranian politics during the later Qajar period. Nasrullah, working his way up through the ranks of government, became the Minister of Foreign Affairs in 1898.

Prime Ministership
Nasrullah became the first prime minister of Iran under the new Iranian Constitution of 1906. Although he resigned on 17 March 1907, his cabinet remained in place until 1 May 1907. After Nasrullah's death, his eldest son Hassan Pirnia inherited the title of Moshir al-Dowleh before also serving as Prime Minister the following decade.

References

Sources
 Jane Lewisohn, Flowers of Persian Song and Music: Davud Pirniā and the Genesis of the Golhā Programs, Journal of Persianate Studies, Vol. 1, No. 1, pp. 79–101 (2008)

|-

|-

1840 births
1907 deaths
People from Nain, Iran
Prime Ministers of Iran
Government ministers of Iran
People of the Persian Constitutional Revolution
19th-century Iranian politicians
20th-century Iranian politicians
Foreign ministers of Iran
Members of the 1st Iranian Majlis
People of Qajar Iran